was a legal scholar, politician and cabinet minister in the pre-war Empire of Japan. He is also the author of the “Matsumoto Draft”, a proposal for revision of the Constitution of the Empire of Japan in the immediate post-war period.

Matsumoto was born in Tokyo to an ex-samurai family. He graduated from Tokyo Imperial University, was accepted into the Ministry of Agriculture and Commerce as a bureaucrat, before returning to Tokyo Imperial University as an assistant professor in 1903. He travelled to Europe from 1906 to 1909 for further studies, and returned to Tokyo Imperial University in 1910 as a full professor.

In 1919, Matsumoto accepted a post on the board of directors of the South Manchurian Railway Company, and eventually rose to the position of Vice-President. From 1923, under the second Yamamoto and the Kiyoura administrations, he served as Assistant Director-General of the Cabinet Legislation Bureau. Matsumoto was elected to the Imperial Academy in 1924, and also became the President of Kansai University the same year.

In 1934, Prime Minister Saito Makoto asked that Matsumoto replace Kumakichi Nakajima as Minister of Commerce and Industry. In 1938, he supervised the implementation of a new commercial law.

Matsumoto returned to the government after World War II under the Shidehara administration as a Minister of State, in charge of the “Committee to Study Constitutional Problems” established by order of General Douglas MacArthur to study constitutional amendment, informally known as the “Matsumoto Committee”. However, the Committee soon decided that only minor changes were needed. Their proposals (i.e. the “Matsumoto Proposal”) were immediately rejected as being too conservative, and a draft of what later became the post-war Constitution of Japan prepared by the Supreme Commander of the Allied Powers was issued instead.

Matsumoto then went into the private sector, opening a legal office, and providing legal advice on commercial issues and acting as a statutory auditor. He also served as a member of the organizing committee for the Tokyo Symphony Orchestra.
Matsumoto died in 1954 and was posthumously awarded the Order of the Rising Sun, 1st class. His grave is at the Tama Cemetery in Tokyo.

References
Johnson, Chalmers. Miti and the Japanese Miracle: The Growth of Industrial Policy : 1925-1975. Stanford University Press (1982) 
Thiel, Markus. The 'militant Democracy' Principle in Modern Democracies. Ashgate Publishing (2009) 
Haley, John Owen. The Spirit of Japanese Law . University of Georgia Press (2006) 
Ito, Takeo. Life Along the South Manchurian Railway: The Memoirs of Itō Takeo. M.E. Sharp (1988)

Notes

 

1877 births
1954 deaths
People from Tokyo
Government ministers of Japan
Members of the House of Peers (Japan)
University of Tokyo alumni
Academic staff of the University of Tokyo
Academic staff of Kansai University